HAL (short for Hyper Articles en Ligne) is an open archive where authors can deposit scholarly documents from all academic fields. 

Documents in HAL are uploaded either by one of the authors with the consent of the others or by an authorized person on their behalf. An uploaded document does not need to have been published or even to be intended for publication. As an open access repository, HAL complies with the Open Archives Initiative (OAI-PMH) as well as with the European OpenAIRE project.

HAL was started in 2001 by Franck Laloë, then at Ecole Normal Superieure, and is run by the Centre pour la communication scientifique directe, a French computing centre, which is part of the French National Centre for Scientific Research, CNRS. Other French institutions, such as INRIA, have joined the system. While it is primarily directed towards French academics, participation is not restricted to them

See also
 List of preprint repositories
 Open access in France

References

Eprint archives
Open-access archives
Bibliographic databases and indexes
Internet properties established in 2001
French digital libraries